Hollywood Seagull (initially titled American Seagull) is a 2013 American drama film directed by Michael Guinzburg, starring Biff McGuire, Lara Romanoff, Will Poston, Barbara Williams and Jay Laisne. It is an adaptation of the play The Seagull by Anton Chekhov.

Cast
 Biff McGuire as Bruce Sorensen
 Lara Romanoff as Nina Danilov
 Will Poston as Travis Del Mar
 Barbara Williams as Irene Del Mar
 Jay Laisne as Barry Allen Trigger
 Blake Lindsley as Mandy Pruitt
 Stevie D. White as Melvin Fuller
 Time Winters as Frank Pruitt
 Sal Viscuso as Dr. Don Dorn
 Christopher Callen as Pauline Pruitt

Release
The film received a limited theatrical release on 27 December 2013.

Reception
Ernest Hady of The Village Voice wrote that the film is "full of unintentional humor, high-school-theater level acting, and shoddy writing."

Martin Tsai of the Los Angeles Times wrote that Guizberg "retains all the dots without necessarily connecting them", and that "when a director merely goes through the motions, even Chekhov can be reduced to daytime soap."

Dennis Harvey of Variety wrote that "despite retaining the basic narrative architecture of its classic source", the film "too often feels like a trite, sudsy take on privilege, ambition and angst among showbiz players and wannabes — one that seemingly exists mostly to showcase real-life C-listers, aspirants and pals in the tradition of Henry Jaglom’s films."

References

External links
 
 

American drama films
2013 drama films